Oswego River may refer to the following:

Oswego River (New Jersey), a tributary of the Wading River in New Jersey
Oswego River (New York), a tributary of Lake Ontario in New York